The 2019 Deloitte Tankard, the provincial men's curling championship of Nova Scotia, was held from January 21 to 27 at the Dartmouth Curling Club in Dartmouth. The winning Stuart Thompson team represented Nova Scotia at the 2019 Tim Hortons Brier in Brandon, Manitoba, Canada's national men's curling championship. It was held in conjunction with the 2019 Nova Scotia Scotties Tournament of Hearts, the provincial women's curling championship.

Teams
Teams are as follows:

Round-robin standings

Scores

January 21
Draw 1
S. Thompson 8-2 Fitzner-Leblanc
Murphy 9-3 Ouellette
K. Thompson 9-6 MacKenzie
Stevens 8-3 MacDougall

January 22
Draw 2
K. Thompson 10-4 Ouellette
S. Thompson 7-5 MacDougall
Stevens 9-6 Fitzner-Leblanc
Murphy 7-3 MacKenzie

January 23
Draw 3
Stevens 8-4 MacKenzie
Fitzner-Leblanc 8-7 K. Thompson 
Murphy 8-4 MacDougall
S. Thompson 9-6 Ouellette

Draw 4
MacDougall 9-7 Fitzner-Leblanc
Ouellette 5-4 MacKenzie
Stevens 8-5 S. Thompson
Murphy 8-7 K. Thompson

January 24
Draw 5
S. Thompson 9-4 MacKenzie
Murphy 10-3 Fitzner-Leblanc
MacDougall 8-7 K. Thompson  
Stevens 9-0 Ouellette

January 25
Draw 6
Murphy 9-8 Stevens
MacDougall 6-2 MacKenzie  
Fitzner-Leblanc 9-3 Ouellette
S. Thompson 8-7 K. Thompson

Draw 7
Ouellette 8-4 MacDougall
K. Thompson 10-7 Stevens
Murphy 8-4 S. Thompson
MacKenzie 9-1 Fitzner-Leblanc

Playoffs

Semifinal
Saturday, January 26, 7:00 pm

Final
Sunday, January 27, 2:00pm

References

Deloitte Tankard
2019 Tim Hortons Brier
Curling competitions in Halifax, Nova Scotia
Sport in Dartmouth, Nova Scotia
2019 in Nova Scotia